Dragonslayer is the fourth and final studio album recorded by the Canadian indie band Sunset Rubdown. It is the second of their albums to be recorded under the Jagjaguwar recording label.  It was released June 23, 2009.  The album was made available for MP3 download with preorder on May 20, 2009. The track "Paper Lace" had previously appeared on Enemy Mine by one of Spencer Krug's other bands Swan Lake.

Track listing
"Silver Moons" – 4:45
"Idiot Heart" – 6:09
"Apollo and the Buffalo and Anna Anna Anna Oh!" – 5:23
"Black Swan" – 6:54
"Paper Lace" – 3:48
"You Go On Ahead (Trumpet Trumpet II)" – 5:43
"Nightingale/December Song" – 5:34
"Dragon's Lair" – 10:28

References

External links
 JAGJAGUWAR

2009 albums
Sunset Rubdown albums
Jagjaguwar albums